A dybbuk is  a malicious possessing spirit in Kabbalah and European Jewish folklore.
 The Dybbuk box is a wine cabinet said to contain such a spirit.

Dybbuk may also refer to:

 Dybbuk (Dungeons & Dragons), a role-playing game monster
 The Dybbuk (play), a 1914 play by S. Ansky
 A Dybbuk, Tony Kushner's 1997 adaptation of this play
 Dybbuk (ballet), a 1974 adaptation of the play
 The Dybbuk (film), a 1937 adaptation of the play
 The Dybbuk (opera), a 1951 adaptation of the play
Dybbuk (film), a 2021 Indian horror film
 Zuby Nehty, an all-female rock group from the Czech Republic, formerly known as "Dybbuk"
 "Dybbuk", a song by Japanese musician and songwriter Gackt Camui
"Dybbuk", track by Sushin Shyam from Ezra, 2017
 Dybbuk (comics), a fictional artificial intelligence and member  of DC Comics' Israeli superteam Hayoth